Corazón apasionado (English title: Passions of the heart) is a telenovela created by Alberto Gómez and produced by Venevisión International in 2011.

Marlene Favela and Guy Ecker star as the protagonists, while José Guillermo Cortines, Jessica Mas and Marcelo Buquet star as antagonists. Lorena Meritano, Luis José Santander, Dayana Garroz and Carlos Guillermo Haydon starred as co-protagonists.

Broadcast history
From April 9 to June 14, 2012, Univision broadcast Corazón Apasionado weekday afternoons at 2pm central, replacing Ni contigo ni sin ti. From June 18 to July 27, 2012, Univision broadcast the telenovela weekday afternoons at 1pm central, replacing El Talismán.

Venevisión has aired the telenovela from February 13, 2012 to November 5, 2012.

Plot
Patricia Campos (Marlene Favela), her two sisters, Virginia and Mariela, and her brother, David Campos, have grown up under the iron hand of their grandmother, Ursula (Susana Dosamantes), a wealthy landowner with a stern and domineering personality. Despite Ursula's disapproval, the teenage Patricia becomes romantically involved with Marcos (José Guillermo Cortines), a poor farm hand—but the relationship comes to a tragic end when he is mortally wounded. Years later, still marked by the loss of Marcos, Patricia has become a bitter woman whose heart is closed to love, and has drowned her sorrow by devoting all her time to managing the family ranch as strictly as her grandmother. Patricia's, her sister's and David's father is the evil man Bruno Montesinos (Marcelo Buquet). Virginia's father is Alejandro (Fernando Carrera).

The arrival of the handsome, charming, and self-assured foreman just hired at the ranch, Armando Marcano (Guy Ecker), drastically changes Patricia's life. Armando has a sister, Rebecca. While at first Patricia fights hard against the feelings he inspires in her, rejecting him, passion ends up taking over both of them and Patricia falls deeply in love. But once again, happiness will not be easy to achieve. Aside from facing her grandmother's opposition to her relationship with someone she considers beneath her, Patricia is up against a formidable rival: her beautiful and wicked cousin Fedora (Jessica Mass), who wants Armando for herself. The situation becomes even more difficult when Marcos suddenly reappears, very much alive and now a rich, ruthless man who'll stop at nothing to get Patricia back.

Virginia is in love with professor Ricardo Rey (Luis Jose Santander) but he is married to drunkard Sonia and they have two children. Mariela is in love with Ramiro Melendez (Carlos Augusto Maldonado). Sonia commits suicide. Bruno rapes Virginia. Patricia marries Alejandro but Marcos kills him; she is suspected of the murder. Marcos and Fedora team up against Patricia and Armando. Ursula has a friend whose niece is lawyer Leticia Bracamontes (Marjorie de Sousa). She decides to be Patricia's lawyer. David marries Rebeca and they have a daughter.

Ricardo Rey starts dating Graciela (Patty Alvarez), an ex-guardian at a prison from Mexico, doctor Alvaro's ex-fiancée. Fedora and Bruno kidnap Rebeca and her small daughter. Armando and David try to save them. Fedora hits Armando in the head; she advises him to go to the swamps area and cross the border. They leave David with his daughter and they take Rebecca and Armando as their hostages. Bruno is attacked. Fedora and Armando manage to escape. Marcos has illusions that he sees Satan and he almost kills his mother. He is committed at a mental hospital. The evil Teresa Rivas Gomez (Gabriela Rivero) ends up paralyzed and Virginia lets her stay in her house.

Marcos admits that it was he who killed Alejandro. Leticia reveals Ricardo that, in the past, she wanted to have Graciela sentenced to life imprisonment because while she was guardian at a prison from Mexico she received millions from a very strong person to kill an inmate; Graciela decided to burn down the prison not to leave traces and 300 women died. Graciela has an accident, ends up in hospital and forces Ricardo to marry her. Virginia is imprisoned and she finds out that she is pregnant with Bruno's baby.

Fedora cuts Patricia's face with a knife and, as a result, Patricia wants to break off with Armando. Fedora helps Bruno get out of the hospital. Leticia falls in love with Armando. Graciela wants to burn Virginia but both of them are trapped in a room by Teresa Rivas Gomez. Ricardo wants to save them but Teresa hits him in the head. Graciela dies impaled.

Both Fedora and Bruno are killed by Marcos. Armando and Patricia get married.

Cast

 Marlene Favela as Patricia Campos Miranda de Marcano
 Guy Ecker as Armando Marcano
 Susana Dosamantes as Doña Ursula Campos-Miranda Villacastín
 Lorena Meritano as Virginia Gómez Campos-Miranda
 Luis Jose Santander and Ricardo Rey
 Jessica Mass as Fedora Campos-Miranda
 José Guillermo Cortines as Marcos Pérez/ Martín Vegas
 Fernando Carrera as Alejandro Gómez
 Gabriela Rivero as Teresa Rivas vda de Gómez
 Marcelo Buquet as Bruno Montesinos
 Carlos Guillermo Haydon as Diego Sánchez
 Daniela Navarro as Mariela "Marielita" Montesinos Campos-Miranda
 Natalia Ramirez as Sonia Alcazar de Rey
 Dayana Garroz as Emperatriz Ferrer Meléndez
 Carlos Augusto Maldonado as Ramiro Meléndez
 Raul Izaguirre as Ignacio Meléndez
 Scarlet Gruber as Rebecca Marcano
 Héctor Soberón as Dr. Alvaro Martínez
 Beatriz Arroyo as Lorenza Sánchez Marcano
 José Miguel Gutiérrez as Father Joe
 Patricia de Leon as Carmen Rosa
 Lara Ricote as Mary Rey
 Kevin Aponte as Juan José Rey
 Christian Carabias as Johnny Gómez
 Carlos Perez as Perucho
 Beatriz Monroy as Ramona Perez
 Eduardo Ibarrola as Melquiades López
 Patty Alvarez as Graciela
 Ahrid Hannaley as Regina
 Marjorie de Sousa as Leticia Bracamontes

References

Spanish-language American telenovelas
2012 American television series debuts
2012 American television series endings
Venevisión telenovelas
2012 Venezuelan television series debuts
2012 Venezuelan television series endings
Venezuelan telenovelas
2012 telenovelas
Television shows set in Venezuela